François de Bonal (b. 1734 at the castle of Bonal, near Agen; d. in Munich, 1800) was a Catholic Bishop and figure in the French Revolution.

He was Vicar-General of the diocese of Agen and Director of the Carmelite Nuns in France, before being made Bishop of Clermont in 1776. In the 1780s, he passed an unpopular decree prohibiting the priests of his diocese from preaching without his authorization.

On the eve of the French Revolution, as Bonal was warning his diocesans against the license of the press, he predicted that visitations of God were coming. In his pastoral letters, he denounced "the mortal poison of an impious philosophy which is spreading among us."

He went as an episcopal delegate to the Estates-General of 1789, and subsequently to the National Assembly, where he led the religious coalition, arguing that "the principles of the French Constitution depend on religion as their eternal basis," and that Christianity was aligned with, not opposed to, good citizenship. In 1790, he led most of the episcopal delegates in refusing to vote on the Civil Constitution of the Clergy, claiming that a lay assembly did not have the authority to make the ecclesiastical reforms involved. In addition to opposing various measures to reduce the power of the Catholic Church, Bonal also opposed granting citizenship to French Jews.

To Target, who spoke of the "God of peace," he replied that the God of peace was also the God of order and justice. 

From his prison Louis XVI sent for his opinion as to whether he should receive Paschal Communion.  In reply, he was sympathetic, but advised the monarch to abstain "for having sanctioned decrees destructive of religion". Bonal was alluding chiefly to the civil constitution of the clergy. 

Having declined to take the loyalty oath to the constitution, Bonal was exiled from France in 1792. He passed to Flanders and later to Holland, was captured and sentenced to deportation by the French, but succeeded in making his escape and spent the last years of his life in various cities of Germany. He was the author of a Testament spirituel.

References
Feller, Biographie Universelle (Paris, 1866)
De GreveCoeur, Journal d'Andrien Duquesnoy (Paris, 1804)

External links

1734 births
1800 deaths
Bishops of Clermont